Jérôme Golmard was the defending champion, but lost in the quarterfinals to Nicolas Kiefer.

Kiefer went on to win the title, defeating Juan Carlos Ferrero 7–5, 4–6, 6–3 in the final.

Seeds

Draw

Finals

Top half

Bottom half

References

External links
 Main Draw

2000 ATP Tour
2000 Dubai Tennis Championships